The 2017 Tennessee Volunteers football team represented the University of Tennessee in the 2017 NCAA Division I FBS football season. The Volunteers played their home games at Neyland Stadium in Knoxville, Tennessee and competed in the Eastern Division of the Southeastern Conference (SEC). They were led by fifth-year head coach Butch Jones until his firing on November 12. Brady Hoke was named the interim head coach for the remainder of the season.

The team finished the season 4–8, 0–8 in SEC play in last place in the Eastern Division and the SEC. They were the first Tennessee team in program history to lose eight games in a season, as well as the first to not win an SEC game since becoming a charter member of the conference in 1932.

Offseason

Departures 
Departures of scholarship players from the 2016 team.

Personnel

Roster and staff

2017 recruiting class

Current depth chart

Schedule 
Tennessee announced its 2017 football schedule on September 13, 2016. The 2017 schedule consisted of 7 home games, 4 away, and 1 neutral site game in the regular season. The Volunteers hosted SEC foes Georgia, South Carolina, LSU, and Vanderbilt, and traveled to Alabama, Florida, Kentucky, and Missouri.

The Volunteers hosted three of its four non–conference games which were against Indiana State from the Missouri Valley Football Conference, UMass, who competes independently, and Southern Miss from Conference USA. They traveled to Atlanta, Georgia, for the Chick-fil-A Kickoff against Georgia Tech from the ACC.

Schedule Source:

Rankings

Game summaries

Georgia Tech 

Sources:

In a renewed rivalry with the Georgia Tech Yellow Jackets, the Tennessee Volunteers traveled to Atlanta to play in their second Chick-fil-A Kickoff Game. The Volunteers never had the lead in regulation play but scored two touchdowns in the fourth quarter to tie the game at 28 and force overtime. Each team traded touchdowns through two overtimes with Georgia Tech ultimately seeking to win the game on a two-point conversion. However, quarterback TaQuon Marshall could not complete the pass, and Tennessee secured the 42–41 victory.

In his first start as a Volunteer, quarterback Quentin Dormady went 20-for-37 for 221 passing yards and a pair of touchdowns, both to wide receiver Marquez Callaway. Running back John Kelly ran for 128 rushing yards and four touchdowns. After averaging 47 yards on six punts, five of which pinned the Yellow Jackets inside their 20-yard line, punter Trevor Daniel was named Ray Guy Award Punter of the Week.

Following the game, Tennessee head coach Butch Jones stated, "That was a very good college football game. I have a lot of respect for Georgia Tech. I am really proud of our players. We spoke all week long about a will to win, and that was the kind of game to find out our will to win. We knew that this was going to be a game that you had to show some resolve and some grit, and you had to play complementary football." He added, "The resolve and resiliency of our defense, even though we gave up [535] yards rushing, we still managed to force two takeaways, and offensively, we didn't turn the football over, which was paramount to winning the football game."

Indiana State 

Sources:

In their home opener, the #25 Tennessee Volunteers hosted the Indiana State Sycamores in the teams' first-ever meeting. From the opening kickoff, which Tennessee freshman running back Ty Chandler returned 91 yards for a touchdown, the Volunteers scored 28 unanswered points. Indiana State's only touchdown came early in the third quarter. Tennessee scored twice more to win their home-opener, 42–7. Following the game, Chandler was named SEC Freshman of the Week.

Tennessee head coach Butch Jones called the outcome "a good win." He added, "With the short turnaround, I thought [our players] did a very good job all week long of trying to prepare their bodies and their minds, so I'm really proud of them. I thought one of the keys to the game was third-down defense and being able to get off the field."

Florida 

Sources: 

In a defensive battle throughout much of the game, the #23 Tennessee Volunteers faced their rivals, the #24 Florida Gators in Gainesville. Down by 10 points in the fourth quarter, Tennessee recovered to allow kicker Aaron Medley to tie the game at 20, after getting stalled in Florida territory with less than a minute to play. As time expired, Florida quarterback Feleipe Franks threw a 63-yard pass to open wide receiver Tyrie Cleveland for a touchdown, sealing a 26–20 victory.

UMass 

Sources: 

Tennessee survived an upset attempt by the winless Minutemen in Neyland Stadium. After a scoreless first quarter, Tennessee was able to breakthrough on a John Kelly 12-yard rushing touchdown. UMass scored later in the quarter but missed the extra point to make the score 7–6. Tennessee scored late in the first half on a Tyler Byrd reception from Quinten Dormady to make the halftime score 14–6. Tennessee distanced themselves with a 40-yard field goal by Aaron Medley midway through the third quarter. UMass pulled within one score on a Sadiq Palmer reception from quarterback Andrew Ford late in the third quarter. Both teams were scoreless in the fourth giving Tennessee the victory.

Georgia 

Sources: 

Tennessee suffered their worst lost at Neyland Stadium in school history against the Bulldogs. In a game Georgia dominated from start to finish, Tennessee only was able to put up 142 total yards, with 91 scrimmage yards coming from running back John Kelly.

South Carolina 

Sources: 

In a sluggish game for both offenses, South Carolina overcame a 9–3 halftime deficit to defeat Tennessee 15–9.

Alabama 

Sources: 

For the 11th straight time, the Crimson Tide defeated the Volunteers in their annual rivalry game. Tennessee's lone score came on a 97-yard pick-six from Daniel Bituli off of Tua Tagovailoa in the third quarter.

Kentucky 

Sources: 

For only the second time in the last 33 meetings, and despite having a turnover margin of 4–0, the Kentucky Wildcats defeated the Tennessee Volunteers by a score of 29–26. The victory marked only Kentucky's third over the Volunteers since 1984.

Southern Miss 

Sources: 

The Volunteers snapped a four-game losing streak in the 24–10 victory over Southern Miss. Running back John Kelly recorded two touchdowns and quarterback Jarrett Guarantano had one rushing touchdown.

Missouri 

Sources: 

Tennessee was forced to start Will McBride at quarterback due to injury. The Volunteers suffered a 50–17 loss to Missouri, which left Tennessee at a 4–6 record for the season and 0–6 in conference. The Vols' loss to the Tigers was their worst loss to an unranked opponent in the AP Poll era.  Head coach Butch Jones was fired following the game.

LSU 

Sources: 

Under interim head coach Brady Hoke, Tennessee was able to go the half  trailing with a 17–10 score. LSU pulled away with 13 points in the third quarter in a game that featured a rain storm. Despite the result, Tennessee outgained LSU in total yards.

Vanderbilt 

Sources: 

In a game that saw Tennessee lose eight games and go winless in conference play for the first time in school history, Vanderbilt dominated in total yardage 529–238. Tennessee stayed in the game through three quarters, only trailing 21–17. However, Vanderbilt scored three touchdowns in the fourth quarter to pull away. The victory marked Vanderbilt's fourth in six games over the Volunteers, a mark that had not been seen in the rival since 1922–1929.

Team players drafted into the NFL 

Reference:

References 

Tennessee
Tennessee Volunteers football seasons
Tennessee Volunteers football